Abramo Albini (born 29 January 1948) is an Italian rower who competed in the 1968 Summer Olympics and in the 1972 Summer Olympics.

Personal life 
He was born in Garzeno in Northern West Italy.

Career 
In 1968,  he was a crew member of the Italian boat which won the bronze medal in the coxless fours event. Four years later he finished tenth with the Italian boat in the 1972 coxless fours competition.

References

External links 
 
 
 
 

1948 births
Living people
Italian male rowers
Olympic rowers of Italy
Rowers at the 1968 Summer Olympics
Rowers at the 1972 Summer Olympics
Olympic bronze medalists for Italy
Sportspeople from the Province of Como
Olympic medalists in rowing
Medalists at the 1968 Summer Olympics
20th-century Italian people